DAMAC Towers by Paramount Hotels & Resorts Dubai is a complex of four skyscrapers located in Business Bay, Dubai. The complex was first announced in 2016 and will be completed in 2020.

The complex was launched by Paramount Hotels & Resorts partnered with DAMAC Properties on 12 March 2013. The Damac Towers project is Paramount Hotels & Resorts first venture into the hotel and real estate industry. Once completed, the whole complex will cost around US$1 billion.

The four towers will have a connecting multi-level plaza with themed restaurants and bars, events facilities, a screening room, fitness centers, swimming pools, kids club and retail zone based on Paramount-branded products. One tower will feature the Paramount Hotel and Residences while the other three will house the DAMAC Maison–Paramount co-branded serviced residences.

Residential towers 
3 of the 4 buildings in the complex are residential buildings. There are 1,140 residential units in total in the 3 towers.

Paramount Hotel Dubai 
Paramount Hotel Dubai is a hotel in Dubai taking up one of the four towers in the DAMAC Towers by Paramount Hotels & Resort skyscraper complex. The hotel has eight types of rooms, scene rooms, stage rooms, premiere suites, silver screen suits, The Don Corleone suits, The Charleston suits, the Carole Suits, and Paramount suites. The suites are themed off of Paramount films such as The Godfather and Gatsby. The hotel has 823 rooms, a 55 seater screening room, Flash back speakeasy bar and lounge that homes the renowned Paramount Hotel Murder Mystery Immersive theater, Pacific Groove surf and turf California grill, The Craft table artesian cafe, the Cheat chocolate lab and the Malibu pool deck and lounge around the resort style pool nestled between the four towers. Paramount Hotel also offers Pause fitness center and Spa. The hotel opened in November 2019.

See also 

 Paramount Tower Hotel & Residences

References

External links 

 DAMAC Towers by Paramount Hotels & Resorts Dubai
 Paramount Hotel Dubai

Hotel buildings completed in 2019
Skyscraper hotels in Dubai
Residential skyscrapers in Dubai

es:DAMAC Towers by Paramount
nl:DAMAC Towers by Paramount